In geometry, Coxeter notation (also Coxeter symbol) is a system of classifying symmetry groups, describing the angles between fundamental reflections of a Coxeter group in a bracketed notation expressing the structure of a Coxeter-Dynkin diagram, with modifiers to indicate certain subgroups.  The notation is named after H. S. M. Coxeter, and has been more comprehensively defined by Norman Johnson.

Reflectional groups

For Coxeter groups, defined by pure reflections, there is a direct correspondence between the bracket notation and Coxeter-Dynkin diagram. The numbers in the bracket notation represent the mirror reflection orders in the branches of the Coxeter diagram. It uses the same simplification, suppressing 2s between orthogonal mirrors.

The Coxeter notation is simplified with exponents to represent the number of branches in a row for linear diagram. So the An group is represented by [3n−1], to imply n nodes connected by n−1 order-3 branches.

Coxeter allowed for zeros as special cases to fit the An family, like A3 = [3,3,3,3] = [34,0,0] = [34,0] = [33,1] = [32,2], like  =  = .

Coxeter groups formed by cyclic diagrams are represented by parentheseses inside of brackets, like [(p,q,r)] =  for the triangle group (p q r).

More complicated looping diagrams can also be expressed with care. The paracompact Coxeter group  can be represented by Coxeter notation [(3,3,(3),3,3)], with nested/overlapping parentheses showing two adjacent [(3,3,3)] loops, and is also represented more compactly as [3[ ]×[ ]], representing the rhombic symmetry of the Coxeter diagram.

For the affine and hyperbolic groups, the subscript is one less than the number of nodes in each case, since each of these groups was obtained by adding a node to a finite group's diagram.

Unconnected groups 

The Coxeter diagram usually leaves order-2 branches undrawn, but the bracket notation includes an explicit 2 to connect the subgraphs. So the Coxeter diagram  = A2×A2 = 2A2 can be represented by [3]×[3] = [3]2 = [3,2,3].

Rank and dimension
Coxeter point group rank is equal to the number of nodes which is also equal to the dimension. A single mirror exists in 1-dimension, [ ], while in 2-dimensions [1],  or [ ]×[ ]+. The 1 is a place-holder, not an actual branch order, but a marker for an orthogonal inactive mirror.

Subgroups 
Coxeter's notation represents rotational/translational symmetry by adding a + superscript operator outside the brackets, [X]+ which cuts the order of the group [X] in half, thus an index 2 subgroup. This operator implies an even number of operators must be applied, replacing reflections with rotations (or translations). When applied to a Coxeter group, this is called a direct subgroup because what remains are only direct isometries without reflective symmetry.

The + operators can also be applied inside of the brackets, like [X,Y+] or [X,(Y,Z)+], and creates "semidirect" subgroups that may include both reflective and nonreflective generators. Semidirect subgroups can only apply to Coxeter group subgroups that have even order branches adjacent to it. Elements by parentheses inside of a Coxeter group can be give a + superscript operator, having the effect of dividing adjacent ordered branches into half order, thus is usually only applied with even numbers. For example, [4,3+] and [4,(3,3)+].

If applied with adjacent odd branch, it doesn't create a subgroup of index 2, but instead creates overlapping fundamental domains, like [5,1+] = [5/2], which can define doubly wrapped polygons like a pentagram, {5/2}, and [5,3+] relates to Schwarz triangle [5/2,3], density 2.

Groups without neighboring + elements can be seen in ringed nodes Coxeter-Dynkin diagram for uniform polytopes and honeycomb are related to hole nodes around the + elements, empty circles with the alternated nodes removed. So the snub cube,  has symmetry [4,3]+, and the snub tetrahedron,  has symmetry [4,3+], and a demicube, h{4,3} = {3,3} ( or  = ) has symmetry [1+,4,3] = [3,3] ( or  =  = ).

Halving subgroups and extended groups 

Johnson extends the + operator to work with a placeholder 1+ nodes, which removes mirrors, doubling the size of the fundamental domain and cuts the group order in half. In general this operation only applies to individual mirrors bounded by even-order branches. The effect of a mirror removal is to duplicate connecting nodes, which can be seen in the Coxeter diagrams:  = , or in bracket notation:[1+,2p, 1] = [1,p,1] = [p].

Each of these mirrors can be removed so h[2p] = [1+,2p,1] = [1,2p,1+] = [p], a reflective subgroup index 2. This can be shown in a Coxeter diagram by adding a + symbol above the node:  =  = .

If both mirrors are removed, a quarter subgroup is generated, with the branch order becoming a gyration point of half the order: 
q[2p] = [1+,2p,1+] = [p]+, a rotational subgroup of index 4.  =  =  =  =  .

For example, (with p=2): [4,1+] = [1+,4] = [2] = [ ]×[ ], order 4. [1+,4,1+] = [2]+, order 2.

The opposite to halving is doubling which adds a mirror, bisecting a fundamental domain, and doubling the group order.
  = [2p]

Halving operations apply for higher rank groups, like tetrahedral symmetry is a half group of octahedral group: h[4,3] = [1+,4,3] = [3,3], removing half the mirrors at the 4-branch. The effect of a mirror removal is to duplicate all connecting nodes, which can be seen in the Coxeter diagrams:  = , h[2p,3] = [1+,2p,3] = [(p,3,3)].

If nodes are indexed, half subgroups can be labeled with new mirrors as composites. Like , generators {0,1} has subgroup  = , generators {1,010}, where mirror 0 is removed, and replaced by a copy of mirror 1 reflected across mirror 0. Also given , generators {0,1,2}, it has half group  = , generators {1,2,010}.

Doubling by adding a mirror also applies in reversing the halving operation:  = [4,3], or more generally  = [2p,q].

Radical subgroups 

Johnson also added an asterisk or star * operator for "radical" subgroups, that acts similar to the + operator, but removes rotational symmetry. The index of the radical subgroup is the order of the removed element.  For example, [4,3*] ≅ [2,2]. The removed [3] subgroup is order 6 so [2,2] is an index 6 subgroup of [4,3].

The radical subgroups represent the inverse operation to an extended symmetry operation. For example, [4,3*] ≅ [2,2], and in reverse [2,2] can be extended as [3[2,2]] ≅ [4,3]. The subgroups can be expressed as a Coxeter diagram:  or  ≅ . The removed node (mirror) causes adjacent mirror virtual mirrors to become real mirrors.

If [4,3] has generators {0,1,2}, [4,3+], index 2, has generators {0,12}; [1+,4,3] ≅ [3,3], index 2 has generators {010,1,2}; while radical subgroup [4,3*] ≅ [2,2], index 6, has generators {01210, 2, (012)3}; and finally [1+,4,3*], index 12 has generators {0(12)20, (012)201}.

Trionic subgroups 

A trionic subgroup is an index 3 subgroup. Johnson defines a trionic subgroup with operator ⅄, index 3. For rank 2 Coxeter groups, [3], the trionic subgroup, [3⅄] is [ ], a single mirror. And for [3p], the trionic subgroup is [3p]⅄ ≅ [p]. Given , with generators {0,1}, has 3 trionic subgroups. They can be differentiated by putting the ⅄ symbol next to the mirror generator to be removed, or on a branch for both: [3p,1⅄] =  = ,   = , and [3p⅄] =  =  with generators {0,10101}, {01010,1}, or {101,010}.

Trionic subgroups of tetrahedral symmetry: [3,3]⅄ ≅ [2+,4], relating the symmetry of the regular tetrahedron and tetragonal disphenoid.

For rank 3 Coxeter groups, [p,3], there is a trionic subgroup [p,3⅄] ≅ [p/2,p], or  = . For example, the finite group [4,3⅄] ≅ [2,4], and Euclidean group [6,3⅄] ≅ [3,6], and hyperbolic group [8,3⅄] ≅ [4,8].

An odd-order adjacent branch, p, will not lower the group order, but create overlapping fundamental domains. The group order stays the same, while the density increases. For example, the icosahedral symmetry, [5,3], of the regular polyhedra icosahedron becomes [5/2,5], the symmetry of 2 regular star polyhedra. It also relates the hyperbolic tilings {p,3}, and star hyperbolic tilings {p/2,p}

For rank 4, [q,2p,3⅄] = [2p,((p,q,q))],  = .

For example, [3,4,3⅄] = [4,3,3], or  = , generators {0,1,2,3} in [3,4,3] with the trionic subgroup [4,3,3] generators {0,1,2,32123}. For hyperbolic groups, [3,6,3⅄] = [6,3[3]], and [4,4,3⅄] = [4,4,4].

Trionic subgroups of tetrahedral symmetry

]
Johnson identified two specific trionic subgroups of [3,3], first an index 3 subgroup [3,3]⅄ ≅ [2+,4], with [3,3] ( =  = ) generators {0,1,2}. It can also be written as [(3,3,2⅄)] as a reminder of its generators {02,1}. This symmetry reduction is the relationship between the regular tetrahedron and the tetragonal disphenoid, represent a stretching of a tetrahedron perpendicular to two opposite edges.

Secondly he identifies a related index 6 subgroup [3,3]Δ or [(3,3,2⅄)]+, index 3 from [3,3]+ ≅ [2,2]+, with generators {02,1021}, from [3,3] and its generators {0,1,2}.

These subgroups also apply within larger Coxeter groups with [3,3] subgroup with neighboring branches all even order.
]
For example, [(3,3)+,4], [(3,3)⅄,4], and [(3,3)Δ,4] are subgroups of [3,3,4], index 2, 3 and 6 respectively. The generators of [(3,3)⅄,4] ≅  ≅ [8,2+,8], order 128, are {02,1,3} from [3,3,4] generators {0,1,2,3}. And [(3,3)Δ,4] ≅ , order 64, has generators {02,1021,3}. As well, [3⅄,4,3⅄] ≅ [(3,3)⅄,4].

Also related [31,1,1] = [3,3,4,1+] has trionic subgroups: [31,1,1]⅄ = [(3,3)⅄,4,1+], order 64, and 1=[31,1,1]Δ = [(3,3)Δ,4,1+] ≅ [[4,2+,4]]+, order 32.

Central inversion

A central inversion, order 2, is operationally differently by dimension. The group [ ]n = [2n−1] represents n orthogonal mirrors in n-dimensional space, or an n-flat subspace of a higher dimensional space. The mirrors of the group [2n−1] are numbered . The order of the mirrors doesn't matter in the case of an inversion.

From that basis, the central inversion has a generator as the product of all the orthogonal mirrors. In Coxeter notation this inversion group is expressed by adding an alternation + to each 2 branch. The alternation symmetry is marked on Coxeter diagram nodes as open nodes.

A Coxeter-Dynkin diagram can be marked up with explicit 2 branches defining a linear sequence of mirrors, open-nodes, and shared double-open nodes to show the chaining of the reflection generators.

Rotations and rotary reflections 
Rotations and rotary reflections are constructed by a single single-generator product of all the reflections of a prismatic group, [2p]×[2q]×... where gcd(p,q,...)=1, they are isomorphic to the abstract cyclic group Zn, of order n=2pq.

The 4-dimensional double rotations, [2p+,2+,2q+] (with gcd(p,q)=1), which include a central group, and are expressed by Conway as ±[Cp×Cq], order 2pq. From Coxeter diagram , generators {0,1,2,3}, requires two generator for [2p+,2+,2q+],  as {0123,0132}. Half groups, [2p+,2+,2q+]+, or cyclic graph, [(2p+,2+,2q+,2+)],  expressed by Conway is [Cp×Cq], order pq, with one generator, like {0123}.

If there is a common factor f, the double rotation can be written as [2pf+,2+,2qf+] (with gcd(p,q)=1), generators {0123,0132}, order 2pqf. For example, p=q=1, f=2, [4+,2+,4+] is order 4. And [2pf+,2+,2qf+]+, generator {0123}, is order pqf. For example, [4+,2+,4+]+ is order 2, a central inversion.

In general a n-rotation group, [2p1+,2,2p2+,2,...,pn+] may require up to n generators if gcd(p1,..,pn)>1, as a product of all mirrors, and then swapping sequential pairs. The half group, [2p1+,2,2p2+,2,...,pn+]+ has generators squared. n-rotary reflections are similar.

Commutator subgroups 

Simple groups with only odd-order branch elements have only a single rotational/translational subgroup of order 2, which is also the commutator subgroup, examples [3,3]+, [3,5]+, [3,3,3]+, [3,3,5]+. For other Coxeter groups with even-order branches, the commutator subgroup has index 2c, where c is the number of disconnected subgraphs when all the even-order branches are removed. 

For example, [4,4] has three independent nodes in the Coxeter diagram when the 4s are removed, so its commutator subgroup is index 23, and can have different representations, all with three + operators: [4+,4+]+, [1+,4,1+,4,1+], [1+,4,4,1+]+, or [(4+,4+,2+)]. A general notation can be used with +c as a group exponent, like [4,4]+3.

Example subgroups

Rank 2 example subgroups 
Dihedral symmetry groups with even-orders have a number of subgroups. This example shows two generator mirrors of [4] in red and green, and looks at all subgroups by halfing, rank-reduction, and their direct subgroups. The group [4],  has two mirror generators 0, and 1. Each generate two virtual mirrors 101 and 010 by reflection across the other.

Rank 3 Euclidean example subgroups 
The [4,4] group has 15 small index subgroups. This table shows them all, with a yellow fundamental domain for pure reflective groups, and alternating white and blue domains which are paired up to make rotational domains. Cyan, red, and green mirror lines correspond to the same colored nodes in the Coxeter diagram. Subgroup generators can be expressed as products of the original 3 mirrors of the fundamental domain, {0,1,2}, corresponding to the 3 nodes of the Coxeter diagram, . A product of two intersecting reflection lines makes a rotation, like {012}, {12}, or {02}. Removing a mirror causes two copies of neighboring mirrors, across the removed mirror, like {010}, and {212}. Two rotations in series cut the rotation order in half, like {0101} or {(01)2}, {1212} or {(02)2}. A product of all three mirrors creates a transreflection, like {012} or {120}.

Hyperbolic example subgroups 
The same set of 15 small subgroups exists on all triangle groups with even order elements, like [6,4] in the hyperbolic plane:

Parabolic subgroups
A parabolic subgroup of a Coxeter group can be identified by removing one or more generator mirrors represented with a Coxeter diagram. In bracket notation [4,3] has parabolic subgroups [4],[2],[3], and a single mirror []. The order of the subgroup is known, and always an integer divisor group order, or index. Parabolic subgroups can also be written with x nodes, like =[4,3] subgroup by removing second mirror:  or  =  = [4,1×,3] = [2].

Petrie subgroup
A petrie subgroup of an irreducible coxeter group can be created by the product of all of the generators. It can be seen in the skew regular petrie polygon of a regular polytope. The order of the new group is called the Coxeter number of the original Coxeter group. The Coxeter number of a Coxeter group is 2m/n, where n is the rank, and m is the number of reflections. A petrie subgroup can be written with a  superscript. For example, [3,3] is the petrie subgroup of a tetrahedral group, cyclic group order 4, generated by a rotoreflection. A rank 4 Coxeter group will have a double rotation generator, like [4,3,3] is order 8.

Extended symmetry

Coxeter's notation includes double square bracket notation,  to express automorphic symmetry within a Coxeter diagram. Johnson added alternative doubling by angled-bracket <[X]>. Johnson also added a prefix symmetry modifier [Y[X]], where Y can either represent symmetry of the Coxeter diagram of [X], or symmetry of the fundamental domain of [X].

To differentiate the second, angled brackets are used for doubling, <[3[4]]> and twice doubled as <2[3[4]]>, also with a different [2], order 4 symmetry. Finally a full symmetry where all 4 nodes are equivalent can be represented by [4[3[4]]], with the order 8, [4] symmetry of the square. But by considering the tetragonal disphenoid fundamental domain the [4] extended symmetry of the square graph can be marked more explicitly as [(2+,4)[3[4]]] or [2+,4[3[4]]].

The paracompact hyperbolic group  = [31,1,1,1,1], contains the symmetry of a 5-cell, {3,3,3}, and thus is represented by [(3,3,3)[31,1,1,1,1]] = [3,4,3,3,3].

An asterisk * superscript is effectively an inverse operation, creating radical subgroups removing connected of odd-ordered mirrors.

Examples:

Looking at generators, the double symmetry is seen as adding a new operator that maps symmetric positions in the Coxeter diagram, making some original generators redundant.

Rank one groups

In one dimension, the bilateral group [ ] represents a single mirror symmetry, abstract Dih1 or Z2, symmetry order 2. It is represented as a Coxeter–Dynkin diagram with a single node, . The identity group is the direct subgroup [ ]+, Z1, symmetry order 1. The + superscript simply implies that alternate mirror reflections are ignored, leaving the identity group in this simplest case. Coxeter used a single open node to represent an alternation, .

Rank two groups

In two dimensions, the rectangular group [2], abstract D22 or D4, also can be represented as a direct product [ ]×[ ], being the product of two bilateral groups, represents two orthogonal mirrors, with Coxeter diagram, with order 4. The rhombic group, [2]+ ( or ), half of the rectangular group, the point reflection symmetry, Z2, order 2.

Coxeter notation to allow a 1 place-holder for lower rank groups, so [1] is the same as [ ], and [1+] or [1]+ is the same as [ ]+ and Coxeter diagram .

The full p-gonal group [p], abstract dihedral group D2p, (nonabelian for p>2), of order 2p, is generated by two mirrors at angle π/p, represented by Coxeter diagram . The p-gonal subgroup [p]+, cyclic group Zp, of order p, generated by a rotation angle of π/p.

Coxeter notation uses double-bracking to represent an automorphic doubling of symmetry by adding a bisecting mirror to the fundamental domain. For example, [[p]] adds a bisecting mirror to [p], and is isomorphic to [2p].

In the limit, going down to one dimensions, the full apeirogonal group is obtained when the angle goes to zero, so [∞], abstractly the infinite dihedral group D∞, represents two parallel mirrors and has a Coxeter diagram . The apeirogonal group [∞]+, abstractly the infinite cyclic group Z∞, isomorphic to the additive group of the integers, is generated by a single nonzero translation.

In the hyperbolic plane, there is a full pseudogonal group [iπ/λ], and pseudogonal subgroup [iπ/λ]+, . These groups exist in regular infinite-sided polygons, with edge length λ. The mirrors are all orthogonal to a single line.

Rank three groups

Point groups in 3 dimensions can be expressed in bracket notation related to the rank 3 Coxeter groups:

In three dimensions, the full orthorhombic group or orthorectangular [2,2], abstractly Z23, order 8, represents three orthogonal mirrors, (also represented by Coxeter diagram as three separate dots ). It can also can be represented as a direct product [ ]×[ ]×[ ], but the [2,2] expression allows subgroups to be defined:

First there is a "semidirect" subgroup, the orthorhombic group, [2,2+] ( or ), abstractly Z2×Z2, of order 4.  When the + superscript is given inside of the brackets, it means reflections generated only from the adjacent mirrors (as defined by the Coxeter diagram) are alternated. In general, the branch orders neighboring the + node must be even. In this case [2,2+] and [2+,2] represent two isomorphic subgroups that are geometrically distinct. The other subgroups are the pararhombic group [2,2]+ ( or ), also order 4, and finally the central group [2+,2+] ( or ) of order 2.

Next there is the full ortho-p-gonal group, [2,p], abstractly Z2×D2p, of order 4p, representing two mirrors at a dihedral angle π/p, and both are orthogonal to a third mirror.

The direct subgroup is called the para-p-gonal group, [2,p]+ ( or ), abstractly D2p, of order 2p, and another subgroup is [2,p+] abstractly Z2×Zp, also of order 2p.

The full gyro-p-gonal group, [2+,2p] ( or ), abstractly D4p, of order 4p. The gyro-p-gonal group, [2+,2p+] ( or ), abstractly Z2p, of order 2p is a subgroup of both [2+,2p] and [2,2p+].

The polyhedral groups are based on the symmetry of platonic solids: the tetrahedron, octahedron, cube, icosahedron, and dodecahedron, with Schläfli symbols {3,3}, {3,4}, {4,3}, {3,5}, and {5,3} respectively. The Coxeter groups for these are: [3,3], [3,4], [3,5] called full tetrahedral symmetry, octahedral symmetry, and icosahedral symmetry, with orders of 24, 48, and 120.

In all these symmetries, alternate reflections can be removed producing the rotational tetrahedral [3,3]+(), octahedral [3,4]+, and icosahedral [3,5]+ groups of order 12, 24, and 60. The octahedral group also has a unique index 2 subgroup called the pyritohedral symmetry group, [3+,4] ( or ), of order 12, with a mixture of rotational and reflectional symmetry. Pyritohedral symmetry is also an index 5 subgroup of icosahedral symmetry:  --> , with virtual mirror 1 across 0, {010}, and 3-fold rotation {12}.

The tetrahedral group, [3,3], has a doubling  (which can be represented by colored nodes ), mapping the first and last mirrors onto each other, and this produces the [3,4] ( or ) group. The subgroup [3,4,1+] ( or ) is the same as [3,3], and [3+,4,1+] ( or ) is the same as [3,3]+.

Affine 

The parentheses of the last group imply the diagram cycle, and also has a shorthand notation [3[3]].

 as a doubling of the [4,4] group produced the same symmetry rotated π/4 from the original set of mirrors.

Direct subgroups of rotational symmetry are: [4,4]+, [6,3]+, and [(3,3,3)]+. [4+,4] and [6,3+] are semidirect subgroups.

Given in Coxeter notation (orbifold notation), some low index affine subgroups are:

Rank four groups

Point groups

Rank four groups defined the 4-dimensional point groups:

Subgroups

Space groups

Line groups

Rank four groups also defined the 3-dimensional line groups:

Duoprismatic group

Rank four groups defined the 4-dimensional duoprismatic groups. In the limit as p and q go to infinity, they degenerate into 2 dimensions and the wallpaper groups.

Wallpaper groups
Rank four groups also defined some of the 2-dimensional wallpaper groups, as limiting cases of the four-dimensional duoprism groups:

Subgroups of [∞,2,∞], (*2222) can be expressed down to its index 16 commutator subgroup:

Complex reflections

Coxeter notation has been extended to Complex space, Cn where nodes are unitary reflections of period 2 or greater. Nodes are labeled by an index, assumed to be 2 for ordinary real reflection if suppressed. Complex reflection groups are called Shephard groups rather than Coxeter groups, and can be used to construct complex polytopes.

In , a rank 1 Shephard group , order p, is represented as p[ ], [ ]p or ]p[. It has a single generator, representing a 2π/p radian rotation in the Complex plane: .

Coxeter writes the rank 2 complex group, p[q]r represents Coxeter diagram . The p and r should only be suppressed if both are 2, which is the real case [q].

Index 2 subgroups exists by removing a real reflection: p[2q]2 → p[q]p. Also index r subgroups exist for 4 branches: p[4]r → p[r]p.

For the infinite family p[4]2, for any p = 2, 3, 4,..., there are two subgroups: p[4]2 → [p], index p, while and p[4]2 → p[ ]×p[ ], index 2.

Computation with reflection matrices as symmetry generators 

A Coxeter group, represented by Coxeter diagram , is given Coxeter notation [p,q] for the branch orders. Each node in the Coxeter diagram represents a mirror, by convention called ρi (and matrix Ri). The generators of this group [p,q] are reflections: ρ0, ρ1, and ρ2. Rotational subsymmetry is given as products of reflections: By convention, σ0,1 (and matrix S0,1) = ρ0ρ1 represents a rotation of angle π/p, and σ1,2 = ρ1ρ2 is a rotation of angle π/q, and σ0,2 = ρ0ρ2 represents a rotation of angle π/2.

[p,q]+, is an index 2 subgroup represented by two rotation generators, each a products of two reflections: σ0,1, σ1,2, and representing rotations of π/p, and π/q angles respectively.

With even branches, [2p+,2q+], is a subgroup of index 4 with two generators, constructed as a product of all three reflection matrices: By convention as: ψ0,1,2 and ψ1,2,0, which are rotary reflections, representing a reflection and rotation or reflection.

A translation generator τ0,1 (and matrix T0,1) is constructed as the product of two (or an even number of) reflections, including the affine reflection. A transreflection (reflection plus a translation) can be the product of an odd number of reflections φ0,1,2 (and matrix V0,1,2), like the index 4 subgroup : [4+,4+] = .

Another composite generator, by convention as ζ (and matrix Z), represents the inversion, mapping a point to its inverse. For [4,3] and [5,3], ζ = (ρ0ρ1ρ2)h/2, where h is 6 and 10 respectively, the Coxeter number for each family. For 3D Coxeter group [p,q], this subgroup is a rotary reflection [2+,h+].

Coxeter groups are categorized by their rank, being the number of nodes in its Coxeter-Dynkin diagram. The structure of the groups are also given with their abstract group types: In this article, the abstract dihedral groups are represented as Dihn, and cyclic groups are represented by Zn, with Dih1=Z2.

Rank 2 

Example, in 2D, the Coxeter group [p] is represented by two reflection matrices R0 and R1, The cyclic symmetry [p]+ is represented by rotation generator of matrix S0,1.

Rank 3 
The finite rank 3 Coxeter groups are [1,p], [2,p], [3,3], [3,4], and [3,5].

[p,2] 

The reducible 3-dimensional finite reflective group is dihedral symmetry, [p,2], order 4p, . The reflection generators are matrices R0, R1, R2. R02=R12=R22=(R0×R1)3=(R1×R2)3=(R0×R2)2=Identity. [p,2]+ is generated by 2 of 3 rotations: S0,1, S1,2, and S0,2. An order p rotoreflection is generated by V0,1,2, the product of all 3 reflections.

[3,3] 

The simplest irreducible 3-dimensional finite reflective group is tetrahedral symmetry, [3,3], order 24, . The reflection generators, from a D3=A3 construction, are matrices R0, R1, R2. R02=R12=R22=(R0×R1)3=(R1×R2)3=(R0×R2)2=Identity. [3,3]+ is generated by 2 of 3 rotations: S0,1, S1,2, and S0,2. A trionic subgroup, isomorphic to [2+,4], order 8, is generated by S0,2 and R1. An order 4 rotoreflection is generated by V0,1,2, the product of all 3 reflections.

[4,3] 

Another irreducible 3-dimensional finite reflective group is octahedral symmetry, [4,3], order 48, . The reflection generators matrices are R0, R1, R2. R02=R12=R22=(R0×R1)4=(R1×R2)3=(R0×R2)2=Identity. Chiral octahedral symmetry, [4,3]+, is generated by 2 of 3 rotations: S0,1, S1,2, and S0,2. Pyritohedral symmetry [4,3+], is generated by reflection R0 and rotation S1,2. A 6-fold rotoreflection is generated by V0,1,2, the product of all 3 reflections.

[5,3] 

A final irreducible 3-dimensional finite reflective group is icosahedral symmetry, [5,3], order 120, . The reflection generators matrices are R0, R1, R2. R02=R12=R22=(R0×R1)5=(R1×R2)3=(R0×R2)2=Identity. [5,3]+ is generated by 2 of 3 rotations: S0,1, S1,2, and S0,2. A 10-fold rotoreflection is generated by V0,1,2, the product of all 3 reflections.

Rank 4 

There are 4 irreducible Coxeter groups in 4 dimensions: [3,3,3], [4,3,3], [31,1,1], [3,4,4], [5,3,3], as well as an infinite family of duoprismatic groups [p,2,q].

[p,2,q] 
The duprismatic group, [p,2,q], has order 4pq.
{|
|- valign=top
|

[[p,2,p]] 
The duoprismatic group can double in order, to 8p2, with a 2-fold rotation between the two planes.
{|
|- valign=top
|

[3,3,3] 
Hypertetrahedral symmetry, [3,3,3], order 120, is easiest to represent with 4 mirrors in 5-dimensions, as a subgroup of [4,3,3,3].

[[3,3,3]] 
The extended group [[3,3,3]], order 240, is doubled by a 2-fold rotation matrix T, here reversing coordinate order and sign: There are 3 generators {T, R0, R1}. Since T is self-reciprocal R3=TR0T, and R2=TR1T.

[4,3,3] 
A irreducible 4-dimensional finite reflective group is hyperoctahedral group (or hexadecachoric group (for 16-cell), B4=[4,3,3], order 384, . The reflection generators matrices are R0, R1, R2, R3. R02=R12=R22=R32=(R0×R1)4=(R1×R2)3=(R2×R3)3=(R0×R2)2=(R1×R3)2=(R0×R3)2=Identity.

Chiral hyperoctahedral symmetry, [4,3,3]+, is generated by 3 of 6 rotations: S0,1, S1,2, S2,3, S0,2, S1,3, and S0,3. Hyperpyritohedral symmetry [4,(3,3)+], is generated by reflection R0 and rotations S1,2 and S2,3. An 8-fold double rotation is generated by W0,1,2,3, the product of all 4 reflections.

[3,31,1] 
A half group of [4,3,3] is [3,31,1], order 192. It shares 3 generators with [4,3,3] group, but has two copies of an adjacent generator, one reflected across the removed mirror.

[3,4,3] 
A irreducible 4-dimensional finite reflective group is Icositetrachoric group (for 24-cell), F4=[3,4,3], order 1152, . The reflection generators matrices are R0, R1, R2, R3. R02=R12=R22=R32=(R0×R1)3=(R1×R2)4=(R2×R3)3=(R0×R2)2=(R1×R3)2=(R0×R3)2=Identity.

Chiral icositetrachoric symmetry, [3,4,3]+, is generated by 3 of 6 rotations: S0,1, S1,2, S2,3, S0,2, S1,3, and S0,3. Ionic diminished [3,4,3+] group, is generated by reflection R0 and rotations S1,2 and S2,3. A 12-fold double rotation is generated by W0,1,2,3, the product of all 4 reflections.

[[3,4,3]] 

The group [[3,4,3]] extends [3,4,3] by a 2-fold rotation, T, doubling order to 2304.

[5,3,3] 

The hyper-icosahedral symmetry, [5,3,3], order 14400, . The reflection generators matrices are R0, R1, R2, R3. R02=R12=R22=R32=(R0×R1)5=(R1×R2)3=(R2×R3)3=(R0×R2)2=(R0×R3)2=(R1×R3)2=Identity. [5,3,3]+ is generated by 3 rotations: S0,1 = R0×R1, S1,2 = R1×R2, S2,3 = R2×R3, etc.

Rank 8

[34,2,1] 
The E8 Coxeter group, [34,2,1], has 8 mirror nodes, order 696729600 (192x10!). E7 and E6, [33,2,1], and [32,2,1],  can be constructed by ignoring the first mirror or the first two mirrors respectively.

Affine rank 2 
Affine matrices are represented by adding an extra row and column, the last row being zero except last entry 1. The last column represents a translation vector.

[∞] 
The affine group [∞], can be given by two reflection matrices, x=0 and x=1.

Affine rank 3

[4,4] 

The affine group [4,4], (p4m), can be given by three reflection matrices, reflections across the x axis (y=0), a diagonal (x=y), and the affine reflection across the line (x=1). [4,4]+ (p4) is generated by S0,1 S1,2, and S0,2. [4+,4+] (pgg) is generated by 2-fold rotation S0,2 and glide reflection (transreflection) V0,1,2. [4+,4] (p4g) is generated by S0,1 and R3. The group [(4,4,2+)] (cmm), is generated by 2-fold rotation S1,3 and reflection R2.

[3,6]
The affine group [3,6], (p6m), can be given by three reflection matrices, reflections across the x axis (y=0), line y=(√3/2)x, and vertical line x=1.

[3[3]] 
R2 is replaced by R'2 = R2×R1×R2, presented by the hyperplane: y+(√3/2)x=2. The fundamental domain is an equilateral triangle with edge length 2.

Affine rank 4

[4,3,4] 

The affine group is [4,3,4], can be given by four reflection matrices. Mirror R0 can be put on z=0 plane. Mirror R1 can be put on plane y=z. Mirror R2 can be put on x=y plane. Mirror R3 can be put on x=1 plane. [4,3,4]+ is generated by S0,1, S1,2, and S2,3.

[[4,3,4]]  
The extended group [[4,3,4]] doubles the group order, adding with a 2-fold rotation matrix T, with a fixed axis through points (1,1/2,0) and (1/2,1/2,1/2). The generators are {R0,R1,T}. R2 = T×R1×T and R3 = T×R0×T.

[4,31,1] 

The group [4,31,1] can be constructed from [4,3,4], by computing [4,3,4,1+], as R'3=R3×R2×R3, with new R'3 as an image of R2 across R3.

[3[4]] 

The group [3[4]] can be constructed from [4,3,4], by removing first and last mirrors, [1+,4,3,4,1+], by  R'1=R0×R1×R0 and R'3=R3×R2×R3.

Notes

References
 H.S.M. Coxeter:
 Kaleidoscopes: Selected Writings of H.S.M. Coxeter, editied by F. Arthur Sherk, Peter McMullen, Anthony C. Thompson, Asia Ivic Weiss, Wiley-Interscience Publication, 1995,  
 (Paper 22) 
 (Paper 23) 
 (Paper 24) 

 Norman Johnson Uniform Polytopes, Manuscript (1991)
 N.W. Johnson: The Theory of Uniform Polytopes and Honeycombs, Ph.D. (1966)
 Norman W. Johnson and Asia Ivic Weiss Quadratic Integers and Coxeter Groups PDF Can. J. Math. Vol. 51 (6), 1999 pp. 1307–1336
 N. W. Johnson: Geometries and Transformations, (2018)   PDF

 John H. Conway and Derek A. Smith, On Quaternions and Octonions, 2003, 
 The Symmetries of Things 2008, John H. Conway, Heidi Burgiel, Chaim Goodman-Strass,  Ch.22 35 prime space groups, ch.25 184 composite space groups, ch.26 Higher still, 4D point groups

Symmetry
Group theory